Economic theory evaluates how taxes are able to provide the government with required amount of the financial resources (fiscal efficiency) and what are the impacts of this tax system on overall economic efficiency. If tax efficiency needs to be assessed, tax cost must be taken into account, including administrative costs and excessive tax burden also known as the dead weight loss of taxation (DWL). Direct administrative costs include state administration costs for the organisation of the tax system, for the evidence of taxpayers, tax collection and control. Indirect administrative costs can include time spent filling out tax returns or money spent on paying tax advisors.

Achieving an ideal tax system is not possible in practice. However, there is an effort to find the optimal form of taxation. For example personal income taxation should guarantee a high level of equity through progressiveness. 

A financial process is said to be tax efficient if it is taxed at a lower rate than an alternative financial process that achieves the same end. 

Passing one's assets onto one's heirs using a Grantor Retained Annuity Trust, for example, is potentially more tax efficient than simply letting the heirs inherit the assets directly.

Tax effects 
Each tax has two effects:

Income effect 
Income effect expresses the fact that entity's tax deducts part of its disposable income, either directly or by forcing to pay a higher price for the goods consumer. Every tax has this effect. Its size depends on the amount of the tax. It grows with the growth of the average (effective) tax rate.

Substitution effect 
Substitution effect means that the taxpayer changes his preferences as his marginal benefits from the consumption of goods, income, labor, leisure, etc. Only flat taxes do not cause this effect. Its size depends on the marginal tax rate. The higher is the marginal rate, the higher is the substitution effect.

Impact of taxes 
The important question is who actually pays the tax. It does not always have to be the entity that pays the state taxes. By the tax impact is meant who ultimately pays a certain tax meaning who is subject to the tax burden. 

The tax subject can shift its cost to other entity (tax shift forward to consumer - VAT, backward shift of the tax to supplier or even employee). The possibility of using the tax shift is given by the flexibility of demand and supply in the market of goods on which the tax is imposed. If demand is relatively inelastic, it is easier for sellers to shift the tax to the buyer. However, if the demand is relatively inflexible, the tax will fall on the seller. The targets of the tax may coincide with its real effects. For example taxing luxury goods may result in a reduction of the revenues of luxury goods producers, not an actual increase in the tax revenue.

Laffer curve 
In economics, the Laffer curve is a theoretical relationship between rates of taxation and the resulting levels of the government's tax revenue. If the tax rates are too high, discouraging labor and investment, a reduction in tax rates may in fact lead to an increase in government tax revenues, because it will encourage the entities to work and invest. 

At the Laffer point (T*), tax revenue no longer increases; on the contrary, as the tax rate increases further, revenue decreases. This is due to the fact that taxpayers refuse to pay high taxes to the state and look for alternative solutions (headquarters in other countries, money laundering, shadow economy).

References

Further reading
 Tax Efficiency
Geld anlegen (in German)
Measuring tax efficiency: A tax optimality index

Taxation in the United States